Raghav Mathur (born April 2, 1981), known professionally as Raghav, is a Canadian singer. He has released three studio albums: the debut Storyteller in 2004, Identity in 2009, and The Phoenix in 2012. His most known commercial success was with "Angel Eyes" which peaked at number 7 in the UK in 2005. His singles "So Confused", "Can't Get Enough" and "It Can't Be Right" also reached the UK top ten in 2004. Raghav continued to have success on Canadian charts in 2010s with subsequent hits like "So Much" with Kardinal Offishall, "Fire", "Top of the World", "Woohoo" and "Until the Sun Comes Up" (featuring Indian actor Abhishek Bachchan and US artist Nelly. In an interview with Calgary Herald in 2017, Raghav says his upbringing in Calgary plays a crucial role in his musical development. 

The singer was drawn to hockey and singing when he was growing up. He was popular in North America among mainly the South Asian community after his first album. Most of Raghav's success has been outside his hometown, Calgary. He travels and tours extensively for performances. In an interview in 2018, he said he was a big fan of Micheal Jackson and Amitabh Bachchan.

Beginnings 
Raghav was born in Toronto, Ontario, to Hindu parents from India. His parents soon moved to Calgary and Fort McMurray, Alberta, where he grew up. Raghav attended Sir Winston Churchill High School, and at the age of 15, music became a heavy feature in his life. Alongside Indian influences at home, he became heavily influenced by R&B. By the time he was 16, he wrote a song that was awarded by the National Songwriters Association of U.S.A. At 17, he moved to Los Angeles, California, United States to develop his vocal skills with Seth Riggs who has trained, amongst others, Madonna, Michael Jackson and Stevie Wonder. A year later, he moved to Liverpool, England where he studied at the Liverpool Institute of Performing Arts. During his time in college, he joined R&B band 11/7 which was nominated for a Mobo Award for Best Unsigned Artist.

Career 

Raghav signed for A&R/V2 Records in 2003 and started working with the DJ and producer, 2Play. This led to the production of his breakthrough single: "So Confused". The song was released in 2004, and reached number 6 in the UK Singles Chart. The next release, "Can't Get Enough", entered the same chart at number 10. In August 2004, another collaboration with 2Play followed, releasing "It Can't Be Right" which reached number 8. Raghav released one more track under his name; "Let's Work It Out" (UK number 15) before his debut album Storyteller was released in September 2004. His final release off the album was "Angel Eyes", inspired by a melody from "Murder She Wrote", by Chaka Demus & Pliers, and featured Jucxi and Frankey Maxx.  The track reached number 7 in the UK chart. The album also included Kardinal Offishall for the song "Sooner or Later", where he introduced the song and had his own verse in it.. Raghav's worldwide tour of 2005 saw him perform in venues such as Karachi, New York City also Africa, Australia, Canada, and many other countries. Raghav's Storyteller has sold 1.6 million copies worldwide. Raghav has been featured (along with songwriter D'Vinci) in the 2007 single "Lonely" by rapper Iceberg Slimm.

In 2009 Raghav announced that he had signed a recording contract with Universal Music India and subsequently released his second album Identity. The album was exclusively released in India. The lead single, "My Kinda Girl" was released as a downloadable track from his website raghav.com for overseas fans and featured hip hop musician, Redman. The album also featured a tribute song called "Quincy Jones" which was dedicated to the American record producer Quincy Jones.

In 2010, Raghav signed his first North American record deal with Canadian label Cordova Bay and released his third album The Phoenix. The first single from the album was the Labrinth-produced "So Much", which was commercially released in Canada and features Kardinal Offishall. The song was nominated for "R&B/Soul Recording of the Year" at the 2011 Canadian Juno Awards. The song was released in conjunction with a Hindi song entitled "Kya Se Kya Ho Gaya" which featured a sample from the song "Hold Yuh" by Gyptian. The second single off the album called "Fire", was commercially released in Canada and peaked at number 38 on the Canadian Billboard Hot 100 and No. 14 on CHR (Mediabase) making it Raghav's most successful single in North America to date. A viral video of the song was released on YouTube on August 23, 2011. He performed his song, "Top of the World" on Breakfast Television on March 22, 2012.

In early 2012, he collaborated with A. R. Rahman and Shilpa Rao for the song "Ishq Shava" from the 2012 Indian film Jab Tak Hai Jaan . He collaborated with him again for the song "Mawalli Qawalli" for the film Lekar Hum Deewana Dil. In September 2012, Raghav was signed to Ultra Records in New York City. Ultra released Raghav's single "Fire" in the US and worldwide in January 2013.

In July 2013, Raghav and rapper Tom E were featured in the single "One More Round" by Michael Mind, as well as on "Celebrate" by Apache Indian about a month later. On October 9, 2013, Raghav released a lyric video of his single "Woohoo" on his YouTube page followed by "Take Me Away" in 2014.

In 2015, he released "Until the Sun Comes Up" featuring Indian film actor and playback singer Abhishek Bachchan and US artist Nelly.

In 2016, he released the single "Do you Like", produced by UK producer Steel Banglez and featuring Moelogo.

In September 2018, Raghav announced he had partnered up with JioSaavn to release "Maayera" on their Artist Originals platform. It has exceeded 10 million streams globally and spent 15 weeks straight in the top 15 of the streaming charts in India.

In the year 2020, Raghav collaborated with Jio Saavn and released a single called sufi. 

In March 2022, Raghav Mathur released a video song named Teri Baaton  from his album named Storyteller and this song features Raghav and some of the best fan creations of the song.

Discography

Albums

Singles 

As featured artist

Soundtracks of Indian films

Awards 

1997: National Songwriters Association of America Award
2004: MOBO Award; Best Collaboration
2004: Asian Achievers Award
2005: Urban Music Awards; Best Chart Act
2005: UK Asian Music Awards; Best Newcomer
2005: Southern Asian Music Awards; Best Artist
2018: Anokhi Awards: Global Empowerment in Songwriting
2018: Brit Asia TV Music Awards; Special Recognition
Nominations
2000: MOBO Best Unsigned Act (11/7)
2008: Global Indian Music Academy Awards: Best Album
2011: "R&B/Soul Recording of the Year" at the Juno Awards of 2011 for his song "So Much" featuring Kardinal Offishall
2012: "Best Song" for CHR and Hot/Adult and Contemporary at the Canadian Radio Music Awards for the single "Fire"
2012: "Single of the Year" at the Canadian Indie Awards again for "Fire"
2013: "Recording of the Year" at the Western Canadian Music Awards organized by the Western Canadian Music Alliance for the album Phoenix

References

External links 

1981 births
Living people
21st-century Canadian male singers
Alumni of the Liverpool Institute for Performing Arts
Canadian contemporary R&B singers
Canadian Hindus
Canadian male singers
Canadian male singer-songwriters
Canadian musicians of Indian descent
Canadian people of Indian descent
Canadian pop singers
Musicians from Calgary
Musicians from Toronto